Aghcheh Qaleh (also Romanized as Āghcheh Qal‘eh) is a village in Bakeshluchay Rural District, in the Central District of Urmia County, West Azerbaijan Province, Iran. At the 2006 census, its population was 903, in 224 families.

References

External links

Aghcheh Qaleh on Tageo.com

Populated places in Urmia County